Isidore Fattal (born 26 October 1886 in Aleppo, Syria – died on 4 September 1961 in Aleppo) was a bishop of the Melkite Greek Catholic Church in Lebanon and Syria.

Life
On July 20, 1912, Isidore Fattal received the ordination to the priesthood and on July 20, 1943, was appointed Bishop of the Melkite Greek Catholic Archeparchy of Baniyas in Lebanon. The consecration took place on 1 August 1943. In the same year and month he was appointed Archbishop of the Melkite Greek Catholic Archeparchy of Aleppo in Syria. His successor in Banyas was Archbishop Antonio Basilio Leone Kilzi, BA. From 13 August 1943 until his death on September 4, 1961, Fattal held that post and died at the age of 75 years. His successor in Aleppo was Archbishop Athanasios Toutoungi.

The "Great bishop of Syria"

In a biography (1963) Archimandrite Ignace Dick referred to the Archbishop Fattal as the "Great bishop of Syria". He writes:

"Archbishop Isidore Fattal was a key designer of during a critical period to the Christianity in Syria. After the war he founded, under the French rule in Syria, the pastoral and educational work in the diocese. In Syria, he led the Christians to religious personality, he promoted the freedom of conscience and personal training. Since 1943 he had restructured, reorganized and reclassified the Melkite Greek Catholic Church in Syria. Thus, the pastors were given their own areas of responsibility, the parishes were divided equally and the bishop sent regularly to them the Sunday pastoral letters. Together with the Bishop of Beirut, the future patriarch of Antioch Archbishop Maximos IV Sayegh, in 1946 he founded schools for girls and trusted them to the "Sisters of Our Lady of Perpetual Help" on the line. Among his works are the foundation of a technical training school, a Catholic Workers Association and the expansion of churches.

Later Syrian governments have recognized its benefits for the country and recorded it with several honors. His strength was never interfere into politics but constantly lead the dialogue with the rulers. His motto "The good shepherd lays down his life for his sheep" (Jn 10,11) showed as Isidore Fattal sacrificed his life to serving his community, this also underlined his heraldic animal Pelican, which is known as a symbol for Jesus Christ and his Parental love. (Excerpts)".

References

External links
 http://www.catholic-hierarchy.org/bishop/bfattal.html
 http://www.gcatholic.org/dioceses/diocese/bani0.htm
 

1886 births
1961 deaths
Melkite Greek Catholic bishops
Syrian Melkite Greek Catholics
Eastern Catholic bishops in Syria